Mohammad Shehzad (born 14 September 1997 in Dera Ghazi Khan, Punjab), also spelled as Muhammad Shehzad, is a Pakistani cricketer who plays for Southern Punjab.

Early career 
Born in Dera Ghazi Khan, Punjab, Shehzad began to play hard-ball cricket in 2015 and in 2018, at the age of 14, he moved to Lahore, learning cricket in its PakLand Cricket Academy. He then played Under-16 cricket, being named the best batsman in the PCB U-16 Pentangular Tournament 2018-19 while playing for Multan Under-16s. Due to his performances, he later joined the national Under-16 squad, in January 2019 playing against Australia Under-16s in the UAE and in May 2019 against Bangladesh Under-16s. He would then play at Under-19 level after impressing the U19 head coach Ijaz Ahmed.

In January 2022, Shehzad played for the Pakistan national Under-19 team during the 2022 ICC Under-19 Cricket World Cup.

Domestic career 
In February 2022, Shehzad was selected for Quetta Gladiators as a replacement pick for James Faulkner for the 2022 Pakistan Super League. 

In March 2022, he made his List A debut for Southern Punjab against Balochistan during the 2021–22 Pakistan Cup. 

In September 2022, He made his T20 debut for Southern Punjab against Central Punjab during the 2022–23 National T20 Cup.

References

External links 
 
 Mohammad Shehzad at Pakistan Cricket Board

1997 births
Living people
Pakistani cricketers
Southern Punjab (Pakistan) cricketers
Quetta Gladiators cricketers
People from Dera Ghazi Khan District